Amy Leach may refer to:

 Amy Leach (theatre director) (born 1981), British theatre director
 Amy Leach (writer), American non-fiction writer